Elysius ruffin is a moth of the family Erebidae. It was described by William Schaus in 1924. It is found in French Guiana, Brazil, Venezuela, Ecuador and Peru.

References

ruffin
Moths described in 1924
Moths of South America